El-Hajji Hussein Radjabu is a Burundian politician. He was the party chairman of the ruling National Council for the Defense of Democracy – Forces for the Defense of Democracy until February 2007, when he was deposed at a party congress. In April 2007, he was arrested on charges of "plotting an armed rebellion and insulting the president by referring to him as an "empty bottle". In April 2008, Radjabu Hussein was convicted of those charges, leading to a 13 year prison sentence.

References

External links
 

Year of birth missing (living people)
Living people
Burundian prisoners and detainees
Prisoners and detainees of Burundi
National Council for the Defense of Democracy – Forces for the Defense of Democracy politicians
Burundian Muslims